The Institute of Continuing & TESOL Education (ICTE) is located in Brisbane, Australia and provides English language courses, teacher training, professional development, and English language testing. Established in 1981, ICTE has experience in the design and delivery of a broad range of programs in Teaching English to Speakers of Other Languages (TESOL) and is able to continue the education of individuals, groups of students and professionals both on and offshore. In 2011, the Institute was named as Australia’s leading education and training exporter, winning two of Australia’s most prestigious export awards – the Australian Export Award (Education and Training) and the Premier of Queensland’s Export Award (Education and Training) in recognition of its innovative and quality services and programs.

The Institute (ICTE) is a division of The University of Queensland (UQ), ranked among the world’s top 50 universities.

Rankings
The University of Queensland ranks in the world’s top universities, as measured by key independent ranking including:

 QS World University Rankings
 US News Best Global Universities Rankings 2019 (42)
 Academic Ranking of World Universities. 2019 (54)
 Times Higher Education World University Rankings 2019 (69)

English language schools are not ranked like universities, however the Institute participates in an annual survey conducted by i-graduate International Insight with input from over 15,000 students and 60 language schools across Australia. In 2018, English language programs scored 97.4% for friendly teachers, and 90.4% for learning support (English Language Barometer, 2018).

Programs

English language courses

ICTE offers a comprehensive suite of intensive English language courses open for individual as well as group enrolments throughout the year including:

 General English
 Advanced English Communication Skills
 English for International Business Communication (Business English)
 English for Academic Purposes

The Institute supports international students who have been offered a place at The University of Queensland with Bridging English programs, and free ongoing English language support for current students and their family members.

Intensive regular English courses run in five-week sessions from January to December each year, and ICTE has an average annual enrolment of more than 4400 students from more than 50 countries and regions in Asia, Europe, the Pacific, Latin America and the Middle East. ICTE also has significant experience and expertise in the design, development and delivery of customised General English and English for Specific Purposes (ESP) programs for groups of students and professionals.

Continuing education

ICTE offers a wide range of continuing education programs for international individuals and client groups. Programs include customised technical, academic or vocational programs, corporate training and professional development, and educational tours.

Training is delivered by the Institute’s professional and experienced trainers, as well as expert presenters sourced from UQ’s academic and professional community. Also, government, leading corporate, business and community organisations. Programs are highly practical and designed to provide participants with skills and insights that can be directly applied to their own academic or industry experience.

Teacher training and professional development

ICTE is one of Australia’s leaders in the field of English teacher training and professional development. The Institute offers pre-service certificate programs, in-service professional development programs, language teaching management and leadership training as well as school governance and administration programs. Programs include:

 English language proficiency and methodology training, English for Specific Purposes: TESOL, testing and bench marking
 Curriculum and program analysis and development
 Organisational and academic leadership, including the International Diploma in Language Teaching Management (IDLTM), management and governance
 Content and Language Integrated Learning (CLIL)
 The Cambridge Certificate in Teaching English to Speakers of Other Languages (CELTA)
 Consultancy and capacity development services
 Delivery of Cambridge CELT-P and CELT-S online teacher training programs

ICTE teacher training program partners include international governments, boards of education, TESOL professional associations, universities, and primary and secondary schools in Chile, China, Ecuador, Germany, Hong Kong, Indonesia, Japan, Macau, Mexico, Oman, South Korea, Spain, Thailand and Vietnam.

Testing services 

ICTE was Brisbane’s first International English Language Testing System (IELTS) test centre. Each year, the Institute administers thousands of IELTS tests, Occupational English Test (OET), Pearson Test of English (PTE) Academic, and Cambridge Teaching Knowledge Tests to candidates across South-East Queensland for academic pathway, immigration and professional purposes.

MOOCs

To help students prepare for the IELTS test, ICTE launched a free massive open online course (MOOC) through the edX community in 2015 called IELTSx Academic Test Preparation. The course has since attracted more than 985,000 non-native English speakers from around the world, making it one of the most popular edX courses globally.

Customised programs 
The Institute works collaboratively with program sponsors (partners) and education representatives to design and deliver customised programs in any location and in a wide range of discipline areas, with or without English language training. Customised program partners include Ministries of Education in Indonesia, Vietnam, Macau, Chile, and Saudi Arabia, and world-leading universities and government agencies across Asia, Europe, and Latin America.

History

ICTE started in 1981 as a small, one-class English language training centre within the Institute of Modern Languages (Queensland) at The University of Queensland under a grant from the Australian Government's Australia-Japan Foundation. Several divisions at the university subsequently combined and were given the Institute's current name in 1996.

ICTE has expanded over time to include:

 The first IELTS test centre in Brisbane (1989)
 Bridging English for students offered a place at UQ (2008)
 UQ International Development division (2016), formerly a division of UniQuest, the university's main commercialisation company.

The Institute has grown an international network of over 165 partner organisations and 100 education representatives which it harnesses, together with the expertise of The University of Queensland and experts in industry, to develop customised programs.

Architecture and campus
The Institute is housed in the purpose-built Sir Llew Edwards Building, a $42 million investment which involved three years of planning, design and construction and was completed in 2008. The building has won numerous architectural awards, including the Australian Institute of Architects⁣ the best public building in Queensland award for 2009.

The Institute is located at the St Lucia campus of The University of Queensland, 7 kilometres from the Brisbane central business district. At its centre is the heritage-listed Great Court – a 2.5 hectares (6.2 acres) open area surrounded by Helidon sandstone buildings with grotesques of great academics and historic scenes, floral and faunal motifs and crests of universities and colleges from around the world. The campus fans out from a heritage-listed sandstone cloister to an extensive complex of buildings and landscaped grounds, including 3 lakes, 8 athletics ovals, 21 tennis courts, a large sports centre and an aquatics centre with an Olympic-sized swimming pool. The campus provides a self-contained environment for students and staff with numerous library and study spaces, health and child care services, art, museum and performance spaces, eating and retail venues.

Notable staff

Christine Bundesen AM, served as Director of ICTE for over 30 years, retiring in 2015. Ms Bundesen was a national advocate for quality standards in English language training and a pioneer of the Australian international education industry. She founded the first peak Australian body for the English language training sector, now known as English Australia, in the early 1980s and went on to play a lead role in Australian English language training standards and accreditation in the 1990s. She was instrumental in negotiating the first Australian Government Education Services for Overseas Students (ESOS) Act 2000 to protect the rights of international students in Australia.

Ms Bundesen is the recipient of many awards, including appointment as a Member of the Order of Australia in 2012 for service to the international education industry. Ms Bundesen is currently a member of the NEAS Australia board.

References

External links 

 Education Services for Overseas Students (ESOS) Act 2000 legislative framework
 English Australia
 IELTSx Academic Test Preparation course

University of Queensland
Schools of English as a second or foreign language